Hermine Lionette Cartan David (19 April 1886 in Paris – 1 December 1970 in Bry-sur-Marne) was a French painter.

Early life and education
Hermine David was born in Paris in 1886. She was born out of wedlock; her mother insisted that her biological father was a Habsburg archduke.

Career
She became one of the Ecole de Paris artists, a group of mostly non-French artists, émigrés particularly from eastern Europe who were working in Paris before World War I. Jules Pascin was another member of that artistic group, whom she met in 1907. By that time, she was already well-established as a successful young painter, miniaturist and printmaker. She followed Pascin to the United States in 1915, where they were married on 25 September 1918. They stayed a total of five years, past the end of World War I. David exhibited in New York City during her residence there.

In 1920, after they returned to France, she exhibited in London and in several solo shows at prominent Paris galleries.

While her finest work dates to the 1920s and '30s, including the book illustrations for which she developed a passion in the '20s, she was active into the 1960s. She won a watercolor prize at the Biennale de Deauville in 1965. Her work was also part of the painting event in the art competition at the 1932 Summer Olympics.

She outlived her husband by forty years after he committed suicide in 1930. She died in 1970 at Bry-sur-Marne.

Her work is included in the collection of the Musée national des beaux-arts du Québec.

References

External links
Hermine David website, (Archives Hermine David).

1886 births
1970 deaths
French women painters
French artists' models
Académie Julian alumni
Painters from Paris
20th-century French painters
20th-century French women artists
19th-century French women artists
Olympic competitors in art competitions